Zapad-99 exercise was a large scale military exercise conducted in June 1999 and its results forced Russia to adapt a new defense concept (Russia's National Security Concept, 2000). The exercise showed that conventional Russian armed forces could not repel a NATO offensive, this in turn increased the tolerance for use of tactical nuclear weapons.

Apart from nuclear controversy, Zapad-99 also sparked international tensions when US fighters intercepted Russian bombers allegedly in violation of Icelandic and Norwegian airspace.

See also
Vostok 2018
Zapad 2017

External links

Russia's National Security Concept, 2000
Kipp, Russia's Nonstrategic Nuclear Weapons, 2001

1999 in Russia
1999 in Belarus
Zapad military exercises
Belarusian military exercises
Military exercises involving Russia
1999 in military history
Belarus–Russia relations